The A71 is a major road in Scotland linking Edinburgh with Lanarkshire and Ayrshire. It adjoins the Livingston Bypass A899.

It runs south west from Edinburgh for approximately 70 miles, through Saughton, Wilkieston and south of Livingston, Whitburn and Wishaw, then by way of Overtown, Garrion Bridge, Stonehouse, Strathaven, Darvel, Newmilns, Galston, Hurlford and Kilmarnock to Irvine on the North Ayrshire coast.

Formerly a trunk route from the east to the west coast of Scotland it has since been downgraded to a mix of primary and secondary routes. From Edinburgh to Darvel, it is now a secondary route, in a poor state of repair in some places. But, from Darvel to Irvine, it has retained its primary route status.

Route

Edinburgh to Newmains

The A71 almost parallels the M8 between the A720 (Edinburgh City Bypass) and the junction with the A73 at Newmains. It passes through the village of Wilkieston and onto the Mid Calder bypass, which leads the route to the south of Livingston. The A71 follows a very straight course through Livingston with several grade separated junctions.

Newmains to Darvel  

West of Livingston, the A71 turns sharply south west, bypassing Shotts, Newmains and Wishaw then descends steeply into the Clyde Valley, over Garrion Bridge at the junction with the A72. The A71 climbs steeply up the western side of the Clyde valley on a road which it shares for a very short section with the A72.

When the A71 peaks at the top of the valley, it goes under the M74 at Jct 8 (a junction known locally as Canderside Toll), before turning towards the village of Stonehouse, where a bypass takes traffic to the north of the narrow village roads, before descending into the Avon valley and into Strathaven. This village, at a meeting of the A71, A723 and A726, provides a link to East Kilbride and Paisley, as well as to Lanark, Hamilton and Motherwell.

Darvel to Irvine

The A71 then becomes a narrow and winding road across moorland, as the road ascends to the head of the Avon valley. At the highest point is Loudoun Hill, an ancient site of human occupation, and the road here follows the route of a minor Roman road which once linked the Clyde Valley and the coast. The road descends into the Irvine Valley, going through the towns of Darvel and Newmilns, and bypassing Galston and then through Hurlford. At Darvel, the A71 becomes a primary route for the rest of its length to Irvine, and widens slightly, with a straighter alignment until its junction with the A77, south of Kilmarnock. The A71 remains as a dual-carriageway until its terminus in Irvine town centre. A crash barrier runs along the central reservation of the dual-carriageway from the A77 to the boundary with North Ayrshire at Dreghorn.

In mid 2014, the road began to subside between Darvel and Newmilns, with the westbound lane being affected near to the entrance to Gowanbank House.  Traffic lights were put in place while a solution was sought, however as of January 2017, a solution has been found and the traffic lights have been lifted.

External links

SABRE page on the A71

Roads in Scotland
Transport in Edinburgh
Transport in North Ayrshire
Transport in East Ayrshire
Transport in West Lothian
Transport in North Lanarkshire
Transport in South Lanarkshire
Strathaven
Irvine, North Ayrshire
Kilmarnock
Galston, East Ayrshire
Darvel
Stonehouse, South Lanarkshire
Livingston, West Lothian
Gorgie